Sir Peter Hugh Morrison (2 June 1944 – 13 July 1995) was a British Conservative politician, MP for Chester from 1974 to 1992, and Parliamentary Private Secretary (PPS) to Prime Minister Margaret Thatcher.

Background and education
Morrison born in Fonthill Bishop, Wiltshire, the third son of John Morrison, 1st Baron Margadale, by the Honourable Margaret Smith, the daughter of Frederick Smith, 2nd Viscount Hambleden, and Lady Esther Gore. James Morrison, 2nd Baron Margadale, and Sir Charles Morrison, Conservative MP for Devizes from 1964 to 1992, were his elder brothers. He was educated at Eton and Keble College, Oxford, where he read Law.

Political career
Morrison was first elected to the House of Commons in the general election of February 1974 for Chester. He was one of the first backbench MPs to urge Margaret Thatcher to stand for the Party leadership in 1975. In 1986 he became Deputy Conservative Party chairman under Norman Tebbit having been previously a Parliamentary Under-Secretary of State and Minister of State in the Department of Employment. In 1987, he was Minister of State for Energy, with responsibility for oil.
It was while he was based in Chester that he became good friends with former leader of the Welsh Conservatives Nick Bourne.

During this period it was alleged that Morrison joined the small group of MPs, who included Michael Grylls and Neil Hamilton, who took money from Ian Greer on behalf of third-party clients. During the Cash for Questions Inquiry, Ian Greer Associates admitted Morrison received payments after ceasing to be an MP. The Parliamentary Report in Hansard quotes Ian Greer as stating he made "Two commission payments, perhaps three, for client referrals" to Morrison between 1993 and 1994.

In 1990, Morrison became Parliamentary Private Secretary to the Prime Minister, Margaret Thatcher; he was the leader of her campaign team in the Conservative leadership election in the same year. He was relaxed about Thatcher's prospects and predicted an easy win for her. Alan Clark went to visit him one afternoon during the campaign and found him asleep in his office. Morrison claimed that he had assurances from enough MPs that they were Thatcher supporters to be certain she would win.

After the first ballot of Conservative MPs had shown that Thatcher did not have enough votes to win outright, Morrison suggested to her that she should consult the Cabinet one-by-one to gauge support. He said to her: "Prime Minister, if you haven't won then there are a lot of Tory MPs who are lying". He stood down at the 1992 general election, being succeeded as MP for Chester by Gyles Brandreth.

Morrison was knighted by  Queen Elizabeth II in February 1991. He died of a heart attack early in the morning of 13 July 1995, aged 51.

Homosexuality
According to the journalist Simon Heffer, Morrison was gay and went cruising (looking for men for sex) in Sussex Gardens, near Paddington station in central London. Fellow Conservative MP Michael Brown, another associate of Greer and himself gay, described Morrison as gay in a column published by The Independent in 2002.

Allegations of child abuse

In October 2012, Rod Richards, a former MP and ex-leader of the Welsh Conservatives, implicated Morrison in the North Wales child abuse scandal.

Between 1974 and 1990, up to 650 children from forty children's homes (such as Bryn Estyn in Wrexham) were sexually, physically and emotionally abused. Richards said that Morrison and another high-profile Conservative politician were named in documents as regular and unexplained visitors to the care homes.

Investigative journalist Nick Davies reported in The Guardian that Morrison received a caution for cottaging with underage boys in public lavatories.

Former Conservative minister Edwina Currie stated that Morrison regularly had sex with 16-year-old boys at a time when the legal age of consent for same-sex relations was 21. In 2002, Currie wrote in her autobiography that "he's what they call 'a noted pederast', with a liking for young boys; he admitted as much ... when he became deputy chairman of the party but added, 'However, I'm very discreet' — and he must be!"

Gyles Brandreth, Morrison's successor as MP for Chester, said that he was told by multiple constituents that Morrison was "a disgusting pervert" and a "monster".

In July 2014, Barry Strevens, a former bodyguard to Margaret Thatcher, claimed that he warned her that Morrison allegedly held sex parties with underage boys. Despite his passing on the allegations to Thatcher, Morrison was promoted later to the position of deputy chairman of the Conservative party. Thatcher's parliamentary private secretary, Archie Hamilton, reportedly took notes of what was said. Strevens reflected: "I am sure [Hamilton] would have given her assurances about the rumours, as otherwise she wouldn't have given him the job."

In January 2015, The Daily Telegraph reported allegations that Morrison raped a 14-year-old boy at Elm Guest House in London. The alleged victim said he was walking in the village of Harting in West Sussex in 1982, when Morrison gave him some money and later lured him to London.

In 2019, Morrison was investigated by the Independent Inquiry into Child Sexual Abuse (IICSA), with evidence from Eliza Manningham-Buller (a former director general of MI5), who had been friendly with Morrison for a time. Manningham-Buller said that she may have provided the cabinet secretary with information including the comment that Morrison had a "penchant for small boys".
In February 2020, the Independent Inquiry into Child Sexual Abuse claimed senior officials within the Conservative Party knew about allegations concerning Morrison for years but did not pass them on to police.

References

External links
 

1944 births
1995 deaths
Alumni of Keble College, Oxford
Conservative Party (UK) MPs for English constituencies
Gay politicians
Knights Bachelor
LGBT members of the Parliament of the United Kingdom
English LGBT politicians
Members of the Privy Council of the United Kingdom
Peter
Parliamentary Private Secretaries to the Prime Minister
People educated at Eton College
UK MPs 1974
UK MPs 1974–1979
UK MPs 1979–1983
UK MPs 1983–1987
UK MPs 1987–1992
Younger sons of barons